José Eusebio Urruzmendi Aycaguer (born 25 August 1944) is a Uruguayan football striker who played for Uruguay in the 1966 FIFA World Cup. He also played for Club Nacional de Football.

References

External links
 FIFA profile

1944 births
Living people
Uruguayan footballers
Uruguay international footballers
Association football forwards
Uruguayan Primera División players
Argentine Primera División players
Club Nacional de Football players
Club Atlético Independiente footballers
Sport Club Internacional players
Defensor Sporting players
1966 FIFA World Cup players
1967 South American Championship players
Copa América-winning players
Uruguayan expatriate footballers
Expatriate footballers in Argentina
Expatriate footballers in Brazil